İstanbul DSİ Spor Kulübü, is a Turkish professional basketball club based in Istanbul which plays Turkish Basketball League (TBL). The team was founded by State Hydraulic Works in 2012. Their home arena is Caferağa Sports Hall with a capacity of 1,500 seats.

Notable players
 Charlon Kloof (1 season: 2014–2015)

External links 
 İstanbul DSİ, Official Website
 Twitter Account

Basketball teams in Turkey
Basketball teams established in 2012
Sport in Istanbul